Huang Zitao (born May 2, 1993), also known as Tao, is a Chinese rapper, singer, songwriter, actor, model, and businessman. Huang is a former member of the South Korean-Chinese boy band Exo and its Chinese sub-unit, Exo-M. After leaving Exo, he made his solo debut in China in 2015 with the mini-album TAO, under the new stage name Z.Tao. Huang made his acting debut in the romantic movie You Are My Sunshine and later received recognition for his leading roles in Negotiator and The Brightest Star in the Sky.

Huang ranked 25th on Forbes China Celebrity 100 list in 2017, 35th in 2019, and 37th in 2020.

Early life
Huang Zitao was born in Qingdao, Shandong on May 2, 1993. As a child, he undertook Wushu training and became a student athlete. In late 2010 he was scouted by a representative from SM Entertainment at a talent show.

Music career

2011–2015: Exo and lawsuit against SM Entertainment
  On December 27, 2011, Huang was formally introduced as the third member of Exo (with the stage name Tao).

In late 2013, Huang took part in filming for MBC's celebrity diving program Splash!, but withdrew due to injuries, and the show was cancelled due to injuries to multiple other contestants.

He featured in two songs from Zhou Mi's album Rewind, which he penned the rap lyrics to; and appeared as a cast member of the Solomon Islands edition of the SBS reality television program Laws of the Jungle in 2014. He left the show early due to a foot injury on a coral reef during filming and other scheduled commitments.

In June 2015, Huang set up a Chinese agency, 黄子韬Z.TAO Studio. On August 24, he filed a lawsuit against SM Entertainment to terminate his contract. Huang claimed the 10-year contract had unjust terms and said he lacks freedom due to the long contract period. However, the Supreme Court dismissed Huang's appeal on March 15, 2018. The exclusive contract between SM Entertainment and Huang was considered valid until his contract's conclusion in 2022.

In China, SM Entertainment filed a lawsuit against Huang regarding his solo activities. Chinese courts ruled that Huang was entitled to use his name and image for solo activities in China, and dismissed the lawsuit.

2015–present: Solo career and mainstream popularity 
On July 23, 2015, Huang made his solo debut with a digital EP titled TAO, which sold 670,000 digital copies in its first week. The album was followed up with a second EP, Z.TAO, which was released for free on August 19 with the title track "Crown". The music video for "Crown" was presented in the style of a 7-minute short film, directed by Nick Lentz and featuring Jessica Gomes. Huang performed the stunts and martial arts sequences for the action scenes in the music video. Huang held his first solo concert Z.TAO Mini Concert at the Beijing Exhibition Center Theater on August 23, as part of a benefit concert for those affected by the Tianjin explosions.

On October 15, Huang released the single "Reluctantly", a ballad composed by himself and Andros Rodriguez. At the 2015 Migu Music Awards, Huang won the "Best Stage Performance" award and performed the single. As part of an endorsement deal with the game I'm the Sovereign, Huang composed and released the single "I'm the Sovereign". The song topped China's Billboard chart for the week of December 5, 2015.

On January 12, 2016, Huang won the "Most Influential Male Singer" award at the 2016 Mobile Video Festival (Miopai Awards). He was later invited to perform as a headliner for the SoYoung 2016 Live Concert Tour on January 29, which featured young rising musicians in China.

Huang's first album The Road was announced in March 2016. It was recorded partly in Los Angeles in collaboration with Nick Lentz. The lead single "The Road" was released on April 22. On May 1, Huang commenced a concert tour Z.Tao The Road Concert for the album in Nanjing and released a music video for the single "Hello, Hello", featuring Wiz Khalifa. Another single, "Adore" was released the same month and sold over 30,000 copies, receiving the platinum certification. The Road was released on August 22 was sold with 8888 pieces limited edition. After one minute of pre-sale opening, the sale profit reached 500k rmb; and the album reached number one on the sale charts. At the end of 2016, Huang won the Most Influential Male Singer award at the Tencent Star Awards.

In April 2017, Huang was named Promotional Ambassador for the 17th Top Chinese Music Awards, where he also won the "All-Round Artist" award. He embarked on his first Asia Tour, Z.Tao Promise Concert Tour which kick-start in Beijing on April 30; and also released a single of the same name.

In 2018, Huang joined the dance-oriented variety show, Street Dance of China. It was also announced that Huang would be the head producer and MC on the Chinese version of Produce 101. The same year, Huang embarked on his fourth concert tour, Z.Tao 2018 IS GOØD Concert Tour.

Artistry and musical style

Following his departure from Exo and return to China, Huang stated that he made a decision to pursue his career in the ailing Chinese music industry, expressing a desire to continue as an artist with the goal of seeing C-Pop receive global recognition. He is involved in songwriting and composition, drawing inspiration from his experiences.

Although he is primarily a rapper, he has also performed Mandopop ballad songs. His music combines elements of hip hop, EDM, and Chinese musical instruments. He cites Jay Chou as his musical inspiration, having listened to his music growing up.

Acting career 
Huang made his film debut in romance film You Are My Sunshine alongside Huang Xiaoming and Yang Mi. The film was released on May 1, 2015.

In 2016, Huang starred in the action comedy Railroad Tigers directed by Ding Sheng, alongside Jackie Chan.

In 2017, Huang starred in the martial arts film The Game Changer, directed by Gao Xixi, as well as the romantic thriller Edge of Innocence. The same year, he played the monkey king in the web drama A Chinese Odyssey: Love You A Million Years, adapted from the film A Chinese Odyssey. The series garnered over 5 billion views online during its run. In November, he was announced as one of the two leads in action drama Forward Forever alongside Jackson Yi.

In 2018, Huang starred in Negotiator, a spin-off of the 2016 hit drama The Interpreter. The same year, he was cast in the youth period drama The Files of Teenagers in the Concession.

In 2019, he acted as a Chinese pop star in the music romance youth drama The Brightest Star in the Sky.

Other activities

Endorsements and brand ambassadorship 
In June 2017, Huang collaborated with Jonathan Anderson, Loewe's creative director, on the "FIRE OF YOUTH" campaign, becoming the first Asian artist invited to collaborate with LOEWE.

In July 2017, Hanhoo appointed Huang as their Brand Ambassador. The brand later partially sponsored The Brightest Star in the Sky, a hit drama of Huang with product placement in the drama.

In September 2017, Huang was named Yves Saint Laurent's beauty ambassador and participated in the second season of YSL's web series Before the Light.

Shenwu3, a turn-based MMORPG game by Duoyi Network which is the 4th biggest game company in China, has announced Huang as their brand ambassador. They collaborated further and Huang released a song called "Silently(默默)" under the branding of Shenwu3 in July 2018.

In January 2018, Huang began promoting a China phone brand, Sugar Phone, and attended the press conference for Sugar Phone S11. In April 2018, Sugar Phone supported Huang's IS GOØD Concert Tour as the main sponsor.

Huang has also been appointed as brand ambassador for YSL Eyewars in January 2018.

Jif Jaf Kraft, Tencent Weishi Application and Xiao Zhu home rental application have also appointed Huang as their first brand ambassadors respectively in first half of 2018. In second half of the year, Huang has endorsed KFC, EVISU, Tuborg, Skechers and Baidu mobile application as their brand ambassador.

In September 2018, Huang worked on the Chinese version of Stay Open, a promotional song for Tuborg originally released by Diplo and MØ.

Sephora launched their first ad campaign in China with Huang as their brand ambassador in September 2018.

In August 2019, Huang also endorsed Hershey's and Nescafe Dolce Gusto as their brand ambassador. Kappa headlined Huang as their brand ambassador for the campaign "I make my own trend" in the same month.

Lacoste appointed Huang as the company's first brand ambassador for Asia Pacific region and launched "Crocodile Inside" campaign in September 2019. In 2021, Huang cut ties with Lacoste because the company had not issued a global statement affirming that they were not boycotting Xinjiang cotton.

Businesses
On July 17, 2018, Huang established his own agency called L.TAO Entertainment. Apart from managing Huang's own work, L.TAO has also signed other artists including Xu Yiyang, a former trainee of SM Entertainment.

Huang has expanded his business further by opening a restaurant called "Hao Shi" and an architecture and design company called L.TAO Architecture and Design in June 2019.

Z.TAO's Man
Z.TAO's Man, a comic and 2D animation character that represents many elements of Huang, was launched in April 2019. Z.TAO's Man is a superhero character whose power is C-pop, the music genre Huang has been promoting and pursuing since the beginning of his solo debut. Huang has collaborated with SunMei Group which is a hospitality business group that owns Thank U hotel chain to create Z.TAO's Man.

Its weekly episodes are released on Sina Weibo's comic platform and a 2D animation is set to release.

Discography

 The Road (2016)

Songwriting

Filmography

Film

Television series

Variety show

Music videos

Concerts and tours

Headliner 
 Z.Tao Mini Concert Tour (2015)
 Z.Tao The Road Concert (2016)
 Z.Tao Promise Concert Tour (2017)
 Z.Tao 2018 Is GoØd Concert Tour (2018)
 Z.Tao 2019 Is Blue Concert (2019)

Awards and nominations

References

External links

 

1993 births
Living people
21st-century Chinese male actors
21st-century Chinese male singers
Chinese expatriates in South Korea
Chinese K-pop singers
Chinese male dancers
Chinese male rappers
Chinese male television actors
Chinese male film actors
Chinese Mandopop singers
Chinese wushu practitioners
Exo members
English-language singers from China
Korean-language singers of China
Musicians from Qingdao
Male actors from Qingdao
Singers from Shandong
Chinese idols
Male actors from Shandong